The Company of Death  (Compagnia della Morte in Italian) is the name used in the historical literature of English language for two related chosen tactical corps, two selected bands of warriors, entrusted to guarantee the cohesiveness and efficiency in battle of both the Milanese and Lombard League's militias through their bond by oath to the defence of the Milanese Carroccio, the wagon on which the standard  of the Lombard allies stood.

They fought in the Battle of Legnano (29 May 1176) against the imperial army of Frederick I Barbarossa Emperor of the Holy Roman Empire, in his 5th Italian Campaign, and were determinant in his decisive defeat.

The two corps who formed the Company of Death were the Company of the Carroccio, an infantry unit of 300 men, and the Knights of Death, a cavalry unit of 900 men, commanded according to tradition by Alberto da Giussano. Historical studies done over time have shown that Alberto da Giussano and the Knights of Death never existed.

The Chronicles

According to a legend reported for the first time by the 14th century chronicler Galvano Fiamma, who wrote 150 years after the battle of Legnano, the Knight of the Death was formed by 900 knights. It owed its name to the oath that its members made, which included fighting until the last breath without ever lowering their arms. According to Galvano Fiamma, the Knight of the Death defended the Carroccio to the extreme and then carried out, in the final stages of the battle of Legnano, a charge against Frederick Barbarossa's imperial army.

From an excerpt from the Chronica Galvanica by Galvano Fiamma we can read:

While, on another excerpt of the same work, this time on the battle of Legnano, we can read that:

The mention of the "battle wagons" is very probably an anachronism, they were employed, without any success, years before the Battle of Legnano of 1176 took place, by a Mastro Guitelmo a milanese Guild-master and magistrate in a previous battle fought in the lands between Rho and Legnano in 1160 AD. It is possible that the chronicler was mixing facts as their effective use at Legnano isn't mentioned elsewhere, it may also be a rhetorical device intended by him to recreate the appearance of the traditional trinitarian model of a "Holy Venture".

The reports of Fiamma should be taken, however, with the benefit of the doubt since in his writings there are inaccuracies, errors and legendary facts.

The Company of Death

The Company of the Carroccio
The Company of the Carroccio, was an infantry unit of 300 men, all of them young volunteers (forming a societas) and Milanese, sworn by oath to die in defence of the Milanese Carroccio. They fought as phalanx in a Sheltron formation around their "Sacred wagon", armed with a large shield and a lanzalonga.

The Knights of Death

The Knights of Death is the name of a temporary military association of medieval knights (a temporary societas), not historically documented, which according to tradition was organized and equipped by a leader known as Alberto da Giussano. It had a great importance during the Battle of Legnano (29 May 1176) where it defended the Carroccio of the Lombard League against the imperial army of Frederick I Barbarossa.

The company was assembled in haste, depriving the Lombard infantry of the valuable support of enough heavy cavalry, "horse" were recruited by Alberto da Giussano around Brescia, and in other eastern areas of Lombardy that had contributed less in infantry and trails to the League. The knights would not be understood in the medieval and romantic sense, but as mere "mounted on horseback" or also "light cavalry". They were very probably particularly cruel and fierce "professional, or semi-professional, fighters", apt at wreaking havoc in the enemy ranks.

According to Milanese chronicler Galvano Fiamma it was composed of 900 men at arms but other sources and modern scholars reduce that number to 300 or, more probably, 500. According to tradition they wore a sort of dark suit (black and gray, cut vertically) connected at the sides, to cover the armour, with probably the symbol of the skull on the traditional small pointed wooden shields.

Historical studies done over time have shown that Alberto da Giussano and the Knights of Death never existed.

Commemorations 
Figures playing Alberto da Giussano and members of the Knights of Death participate in the historic parade of the Palio di Legnano. Later, these figures, at the city stadium, before the horse race, repropose the position that, according to legend, was made by Alberto da Giussano and the Knights of Death in the final stages of the battle of Legnano.

See also
Alberto da Giussano
Battle of Legnano
Lombard League

References

Bibliography
 
Chronicon Vincentii Canonici Pragensis in Monumenta historica Boemiae by Fr. Gelasius Dobner (1764)
 
 
I. R. Dieterich, "Die Taktik in den Lombardenkriegen der Staufer", Marburg, 1892
 
 
Alberto Peruffo, Alberto da Giussano tra realtà e mito 
Federico A. Rossi Di Marignano: "Federico Barbarossa e Beatrice di Borgogna. Re e regina d'Italia", Mondadori, 2009,

External links
Company of Death (book), published by Legano
Sword of War (film), 2009, at IMDB

Wars of the Guelphs and Ghibellines
History of Lombardy
Military units and formations of the Middle Ages